Earvin Johnson III (born June 4, 1992) is an American television personality and socialite.

Early life 
Earvin Johnson III was born on June 4, 1992 in Beverly Hills, California, to Earvin "Magic" Johnson and Earlitha "Cookie" Johnson (née Kelly). He has an older brother, Andre, and a younger sister, Elisa. He was raised in the Pentecostal Christian faith. Johnson attended New York University, studying hospitality with a focus on event planning and design. Johnson came out as gay to his family at the age of 17 and came out publicly in 2013 after a report by TMZ published pictures of him holding hands with a male friend. He was supported by his family in his decision to come out publicly. After coming out, Johnson left the West Angeles Church of God in Christ, the church in which he grew up, due to their views on homosexuality.

Career 
Johnson joined the cast of the E! reality television series Rich Kids of Beverly Hills in 2014 as a recurring cast member on the first season. He became a main cast member for the next three seasons. The show was canceled after four seasons. Johnson then starred in his own spin-off reality series EJNYC, one of the first reality series to profile a young LGBTQ person of color. In 2014, Johnson joined E! News as a news personality and commentator, covering shows for New York Fashion Week as well as having a recurring commentary role on Fashion Police. He also appeared as a guest commentator on Hello Ross in 2014. He was a guest star during season 4 of Real Husbands of Hollywood. In 2016 Johnson was featured in an It Got Better short documentary produced by L/Studio. In 2017, Johnson moderated a panel at BeautyCon called The Gender Revolution. In 2017 Johnson was a guest host on The Real. In an ESPN interview with Kelley L. Carter, Johnson discussed his television experiences and plans to pursue a career in fashion. On May 12, 2021, it was announced that Johnson would voice the character of Michael Collins in the reboot of The Proud Family: Louder and Prouder, a role played in the original series by Phil LaMarr.

Personal life 
In 2015, Johnson underwent gastric sleeve surgery. Johnson has been noted for his feminine and androgynous fashion style. He revealed that after Caitlyn Jenner's coming out as transgender, he thought about transitioning, but decided against it.

Johnson is close friends with Gaïa Jacquet-Matisse, Kyra Kennedy, Reya Benitez, Ezra J. William, Andrew Warren, and Tiffany Trump. The group has been nicknamed the "Rich Kids of Instagram" by the New York Post and the "Snap Pack" by The New York Times and New York Magazine.

References 

Living people
1992 births
American socialites
African-American television personalities
Gay entertainers
LGBT African Americans
American LGBT entertainers
LGBT people from California
Magic Johnson
Fashion influencers
Male-to-female cross-dressers
New York University alumni
Participants in American reality television series
People from Beverly Hills, California
Television personalities from California
Male bloggers